Tampereen Ilves is a sports club based in Tampere, Finland that has multiple affiliated sports teams:

FC Ilves, men's professional football team playing in the Veikkausliiga
Ilves, men's professional ice hockey team playing in the Liiga (independent organization; originally a subsidiary of Tampereen Ilves)
Ilves FS, men's futsal team playing in the Futsal-Liiga
Ilves Naiset, women's top-level ice hockey team playing in the Naisten Liiga

Ilves may also refer to:

Ilves (surname)
Hotel Ilves, a hotel in Tampere, Finland
Jämsänkosken Ilves, a Finnish sports club from Jämsänkoski
Riihimäen Ilves, a Finnish football club from Riihimäki
SS Edenhurst or SS Ilves, a cargo ship